The 2022–2023 Amateur Scottish Inter-District Championship is a rugby union competition for Scotland's amateur district teams.

This is the fourth season of the re-instated Amateur Scottish Inter-District Championship in the professional era, and the first championship since the last professional inter-district championship of 2002–03 season; and the first amateur championship since the last Amateur Scottish Inter-District Championship was played over 20 years previously in the 2001–02 season.

The teams involved would be the traditional sides of Glasgow District which incorporates Glasgow and the west of Scotland; Edinburgh District which incorporates the Lothians; Caledonia which incorporates the Midlands District and the North of Scotland District; and the South of Scotland District.

The format of this season's championship would not be the traditional round-robin; but a knock-out competition. The districts above would play off their 'semi-finals' for a place in the final. The losing semi-finalists would play off for the 3rd - 4th place.

The Inter-District Championship will not include Glasgow Warriors or Edinburgh Rugby professional players from the United Rugby Championship; or any players from the professional Super 6 league.

Instead players will be drawn from the Scottish amateur leagues of the Scottish Premiership and the national leagues below.

The intention of this amateur inter-district championship is to:
1. recognise players who have consistently performed with distinction for their club and provide them with an opportunity to represent their district;
2. provide an avenue for clubs to work in collaboration, strengthen relationships, and celebrate rugby in the region;
3. offer selected players and coaches a development opportunity through a higher standard of competition and;
4. provide a future selection vehicle for the Scotland Club XV international team.

The reprise of the amateur inter-district championship came about as Glasgow Hutchesons Aloysians proposed that the professional Super 6 league be scrapped so that monies freed could be directed towards the amateur clubs, and a regional club competition be re-instated. However the amendment put forward to re-instate the Inter-District Championship and thus keep the professional Super 6 league won with 72 votes to 46 votes.

A league table is included for completeness.

2022-23 league table

Results

Semi-finals

South of Scotland: 

Edinburgh District: 

Caledonia:

Glasgow District:

3rd-4th play off

 :

 :

Final

 :

 :

References

2022–23 in Scottish rugby union
2022–2023
Scot